This is a list of current Ambassadors of Ethiopia.

Current Ethiopian ambassadors

References

Ethiopia
Main